A Man for Emmanuelle is an Italian drama film directed by Cesare Canevari and starring Erika Blanc.

Cast
 Erika Blanc as Emmanuelle
 Adolfo Celi as Sandro
 Paolo Ferrari as Raffaello
 Milla Sannoner as Lesbian
 Sandro Korso as Writer
 Ben Salvador as Hippy

Production
The film was based on the short story Disintegrazione '68 by Graziella Di Prospero.

Reception
In a contemporary review, the Monthly Film Bulletin described the film as having "all the visual clichés associated with directors like Lelouch and Albicocco (sudden focus changes, elaborate zooming on to flower pots and such)" and that "the tone is so monotonous and risible, however, that any intended serious comment is lost in a welter of cheap effects".

References

External links

Italian drama films
1960s Italian-language films
1969 drama films
Films directed by Cesare Canevari
Films scored by Gianni Ferrio
1960s Italian films